The Lesson is a one-act play by French-Romanian playwright Eugène Ionesco. It was first performed in 1951 in a production directed by Marcel Cuvelier (who also played the Professor). Since 1957 it has been in permanent showing at Paris' Théâtre de la Huchette, on an Ionesco double-bill with The Bald Soprano.  The play is regarded as an important work in the "Theatre of the Absurd".

Plot summary
This play takes place in the office and dining room of a small French flat. The Professor, a man of 50 to 60, is expecting a new Pupil (aged 18). The Professor's Maid, a stout, red-faced woman of 40 to 50, worries about the Professor's health. As the absurd and nonsensical lesson progresses, the Professor grows more and more angry with what he perceives as the Pupil's ignorance, and the Pupil becomes more and more quiet and meek. Even her health begins to deteriorate, and what starts as a toothache develops into her entire body aching. At the climax of the play, after a long bout of non sequiturs (which are frequently used in Ionesco's plays), the Professor stabs and murders the Pupil. The play ends with the Maid greeting a new Pupil, taking the play full circle, back to the beginning.

Adaptations
The Danish choreographer Flemming Flindt adapted the play as the libretto to a score by Georges Delerue for his first ballet, The Private Lesson (Enetime) in 1963. The Professor in Flindt's adaptation is a ballet teacher. The ballet was commissioned by Danish television and received its 1964 stage premiere in Paris with the Royal Danish Ballet on tour. Among other companies, it is danced by the Joffrey Ballet and the leading role has been performed by Rudolf Nureyev as well as other danseurs.
In 2009, PK Productions, under the direction of Patrick Kennedy staged the play at the Edinburgh Fringe Festival as a naturalistic drama.

References

Sources
 Banham, Martin, ed. 1998. The Cambridge Guide to Theatre. Cambridge: Cambridge UP. .

External links
 Eugène Ionesco & La Leçon Eugène Ionesco, La Leçon, 1951

Plays by Eugène Ionesco
1951 plays
French plays
Theatre of the Absurd
One-act plays